William Albert Ashbrook (July 1, 1867 – January 1, 1940) was an American businessman, newspaper publisher, and Democratic politician from Ohio.

He was born near Johnstown, Licking County, Ohio, and attended the local public schools. Later, he studied business in Lansing, Michigan.

In 1884 he founded a newspaper, The Johnstown Independent.  He also engaged in banking.  From 1893 to 1897 he served as postmaster of Johnstown.

He entered politics as a Democrat and won a seat to the Ohio House of Representatives in 1904.  In 1906 he was elected to the U.S. House, where he served until he was defeated in the 1920 elections.  Returning home, he resumed his newspaper publishing and banking career in Johnstown.  He married Marie Swank and they had a son, John M. Ashbrook, in 1928.  He ran in a successful comeback campaign for Congress in 1934, and served there until his death.

His son John would later succeed him in that congressional seat from 1961 to 1982 as a Republican.

See also
 List of United States Congress members who died in office (1900–49)

External links

"Memorial Services held in the House of Representatives of the United States, together with remarks presented in eulogy of William Albert Ashbrook late a Representative from Ohio frontispiece 1941"

1867 births
1940 deaths
People from Licking County, Ohio
Democratic Party members of the Ohio House of Representatives
Democratic Party members of the United States House of Representatives from Ohio
Members of the United States Assay Commission
19th-century American newspaper publishers (people)
Journalists from Ohio